The Women's 200m Butterfly event at the 10th FINA World Aquatics Championships swam 23–24 July 2003 in Barcelona, Spain. Preliminary heats swam in the morning session of 20 July, with the top-16 finishers advancing to semifinal heats that evening. The top-8 finishers from the Semifinals then advanced to swim again in the Final the next evening.

At the start of the event, the World (WR) and Championship (CR) records were:
WR: 2:05.78 swum by Otylia Jędrzejczak (Poland) on August 4, 2002 in Berlin, Germany.
CR: 2:06.73 swum by Petria Thomas (Australia) on July 23, 2001 in Fukuoka, Japan

Results

Final

Semifinals

Preliminaries

References

Women's 200 metre butterfly
Swimming at the 2003 World Aquatics Championships
2003 in women's swimming